Maikel Jose García (born March 3, 2000) is a Venezuelan professional baseball shortstop for the Kansas City Royals of Major League Baseball (MLB).

Career
García signed with the Kansas City Royals as an international free agent on July 27, 2016. He made his professional debut with the Dominican Summer League Royals, hitting .223/.277/.242 with no home runs, 7 RBI, and 9 stolen bases.

García split the 2018 season between the DSL Royals and the rookie-level Arizona League Royals, hitting a cumulative .222/.311/.260 with no home runs, 11 RBI, and 20 stolen bases in 52 contests. In 2019, he spent time with the Idaho Falls Chukars and Burlington Royals, both rookie-level teams, and batted .284/.349/.367 with one home run, 35 RBI, and 19 stolen bases in 57 games. García did not play in a game in 2020 due to the cancellation of the minor league season because of the COVID-19 pandemic.

García split the 2021 season between the Single-A Columbia Fireflies and the High-A Quad Cities River Bandits, slashing .291/.380/.405 with 4 home runs, 50 RBI, and 35 stolen bases. The Royals added him to their 40-man roster after the 2021 season.

García was assigned to the Double-A Northwest Arkansas Naturals to begin the 2022 season. On July 14, García was recalled and promoted to the major leagues for the first time. He made his MLB debut the next day against the Toronto Blue Jays, striking out in his lone plate appearance. On July 17, he was optioned back to Double-A. In an 11-5 loss against the New York Yankees on July 30, García collected his first three career hits, the first of which coming off of Yankees starter Gerrit Cole.

Personal life
García’s cousin is 13-year MLB shortstop Alcides Escobar, who is currently a free agent.

References

External links

2000 births
Living people
Major League Baseball players from Venezuela
Major League Baseball shortstops
Kansas City Royals players
Dominican Summer League Royals players
Arizona League Royals players
Burlington Royals players
Idaho Falls Chukars players
Tiburones de La Guaira players
Columbia Fireflies players
Quad Cities River Bandits players
Northwest Arkansas Naturals players
Venezuelan expatriate baseball players in the Dominican Republic
Venezuelan expatriate baseball players in the United States